"Rhacophorus" depressus is a species of frog of uncertain taxonomic status—it is a species inquirenda that probably belongs to family Ranidae, rather to the family Rhacophoridae as its name suggests. It was described by Ernst Ahl in 1927 based on two syntypes allegedly from "Java" (Indonesia), although the accuracy of this type locality has been questioned—the specimens might even not come from Asia.

References

True frogs
Taxa named by Ernst Ahl
Amphibians described in 1927
Taxonomy articles created by Polbot